Fatos Lala (born 8 April 1995) is an Albanian footballer and futsal player who plays as a midfielder for FSHF Sunday League club Dajti.

Career

Early career

Lala was born in Kukës in northern Albania near the border with Kosovo, but 6 months after his birth his family moved to the capital Tirana. He began playing football with a local amateur side called 22 Marsi before joining KF Tirana at the age of 16 in 2011, playing for the under-17 side. between 2009 and 2011 he scored 25 goals in 25 games for the under-17 side before being promoted to the under-19 side where he played as a midfielder as opposed to his previous position as a striker, and he still managed to score 20 times in 32 games between 2011 and 2013.

In the summer of 2013 he left KF Tirana to join his first senior side, FK Gostima in the Albanian Third Division, the fourth tier of football in Albania. He had an injury plagued 2013−14 season and only managed to feature in 9 league games, scoring just once.

In 2014, he signed his first professional contract with Albanian First Division side KS Kamza. Currently he plays for F.C Dajti .

References

1995 births
Living people
People from Kukës
Association football midfielders
Albanian footballers
KF Tirana players
FC Kamza players
FK Vora players
FC Kevitan players
Kategoria e Parë players